The Velmerstot is the northernmost and highest hill in the Eggegebirge ridge in the German state of North Rhine-Westphalia. It has two summits, the Prussian Velmerstot (Preußische Velmerstot) (468 m), which lies on the territory of Steinheim-Sandebeck in the county of Höxter, and the Lippe Velmerstot (Lippische Velmerstot) (441 m), which is located in the county of Lippe. The whole hill is part of the Teutoburg Forest / Egge Hills Nature Park.

During the Cold War, the hill had a NATO and Dutch air defence installations; they left by 1994 and the installations were torn down in 2002/03.

References

Literature 
 Hans-Martin Wienke: Silbermühle, Velmerstot und die Höhlen des Teutoburger Waldes. Schnelle, Detmold, o.J. (1982?)

External links 
 Nature reserve of Lippischer Velmerstot and Egge-Osthang, Natura2000 entry

Nature reserves in North Rhine-Westphalia
Mountains and hills of North Rhine-Westphalia
Lippe
Natura 2000 in Germany